Young Blood (Swedish: Ungt blod) is a 1943 Swedish drama film directed by Ivar Johansson and starring Agneta Lagerfeldt, Toivo Pawlo and Olof Widgren. It was shot at the Centrumateljéerna Studios in Stockholm. The film's sets were designed by the art director Bertil Duroj.

Cast
 Agneta Lagerfeldt as Eva Lindemark
 Toivo Pawlo as 	Åke Sjögren
 Olof Widgren as 	Sven Lindahl
 Barbro Ribbing as 	Anne-Marie Björkman
 Åke Claesson as 	Lars-Erik Hermansson
 Åke Grönberg as 	Gustaf Johansson
 Hugo Björne as 	Arvid Wetterberg
 Sven Bergvall as 	Per Lindemark
 Anna Lindahl as Lisa Lindemark
 Marianne Inger as Ingrid Forslund
 Britta Holmberg as 	Maj-Britt Hassel
 Christian Bratt as 	Lennart Berger
 Harry Ahlin as 	Hjelm
 Anna Lisa Bruce as 	Anna Karlsson
 Gunnel Edlund as 	Margit Modin
 Ernst Eklund as Major Björn Lindemark
 Ingrid Envall as 	Young Girl
 Margareta Fahlén as 	Karin Sandström
 Margareta Grimberg as 	Ellen Lönnquist
 Marianne Gyllenhammar as 	Maud von Rehnsköld
 Lennart Holmqvist as 	Nils Norrman
 Gunnar Höglund as 	Paul Pettersson
 Birgit Johannesson as 	Ann-Sophie Berg
 Ulla Kihlberg as 	Solveig Thysell
 Kolbjörn Knudsen as 	Karl-Hugo Stadius
 Sten Lindgren as 	Dr. Malm
 Rune Lycke as Young Man
 Marie-Louise Martins as 	Vivi Svensson
 Stig Olin as 	Pelle Persson
 Erik Rosén as 	Ulf Ragnar Thomasson
 Tulli Sjöblom as 	Birgit Frisk
 Kurt Willbing as 	Karl-Axel Eriksson
 Signe Wirff as Mrs. Lindemark
 Nils Åsblom as Erik Thysell

References

Bibliography 
 Qvist, Per Olov & von Bagh, Peter. Guide to the Cinema of Sweden and Finland. Greenwood Publishing Group, 2000.

External links 
 

1943 films
Swedish drama films
1943 drama films
1940s Swedish-language films
Films directed by Ivar Johansson
Swedish black-and-white films
1940s Swedish films